MDDS may refer to:

MDDS (document), an official Indian document of common metadata standards regarding e-governance
Mal de debarquement (MdDS), a rare neurological condition
Mitochondrial DNA depletion syndrome, a group of autosomal recessive disorders

See also
 MDD (disambiguation)